The International Confederation of Revolver Enthusiasts (ICORE) is an international community which promotes action shooting competitions with revolvers. ICORE was founded in 1991 by Mike and Sharon Higashi with a vision of revolver-only competitions where "even the most basic equipment could be used and still provide enjoyment and satisfaction."

The sport has elements from the Bianchi Cup, IPSC, and the Steel Challenge, and has active members in Australia, Canada, Germany, Italy, Malta and United States.

Scoring 
The scoring method used is Time-Plus Scoring, where the score is the time used by the competitor to complete the course plus time added or subtracted based on hits.

Targets 
Both paper targets and steel targets (falling and stationary) are used. The standard paper target is the NRA D-1 target which has 4 scoring areas.

International Revolver Champions 
The following is a list of previous and current Revolver World Champions.

See also 
 List of shooting sports organizations

References

External links 
 Video about ICORE on Vimeo

Shooting sports organizations